Sweet Thing is a 1999 American drama film directed by Mark David, starring Jeremy Fox, Amalia Stifter, Ev Lunning Jr., Lana Dieterich, Michael Dalmon and Tim Curry Sr..

Cast
 Jeremy Fox as Sean Fields
 Evan Greenwalt as Young Sean Fields
 Amalia Stifter as Hannah
 Ev Lunning Jr. as Judge Ray Fields
 Lana Dieterich as Vivian Fields
 Michael Dalmon as Weiss
 Tim Curry Sr. as Solomon Bordreaux
 Stephen Bruton as Davey

Release
The film premiered at the Seattle International Film Festival on 6 June 1999.

Reception
Merle Bertrand of Film Threat called the film "provocative and gorgeous to look at" yet "sullen and sluggish". Eddie Cockrell of Variety wrote that the "fine work" of Fox, Curry and Bruton are "undercut" by "unfocused" castmates and David's "ambitious scope".

TV Guide wrote that the film's "febrile subject matter is so dully dramatized that only the most determined viewer will make it to the final revelations." Sarah Hepola of the The Austin Chronicle called the film "all splash and flash and unfortunately, little else". Chris Riemenschneider of the Austin American-Statesman wrote that the film "depresses and numbs more than it opens any cans of worms".

References

External links
 
 

American drama films
1999 drama films